Thomas Maling may refer to:

 Simon Maling (Simon Thomas Maling, born 1975), New Zealand rugby union player
 Thomas James Maling (1778–1849), Royal Navy officer